Elisabetta Fantone (born August 12, 1982) is a Canadian actress.

Career

Recording artist
In January 2007, Fantone released her first single Feel a remix of the song by Robbie Williams. The song was partly translated in Italian and has a house-trance style. The song featured on Tycoon Records' MC Mario's Mixdown 2007 distributed by Sony.

Feel hit no.2 on the Club Mix on Mix 96 (now Virgin Radio). The song was played on the Quebec television show Minuit, le soir.

Author
The book Journal Intime d'une lofteuse, based on Fantone's reality television appearances on "Loft Story 2," was released by Les Publications Charron & Cie in May 2008.

Filmography

 The film was in the official selection of the 2009 Montreal World Film Festival and the Fantasia Film Festival.

References

1. "Elisabetta Fantone in Feature Film"

2. "The 10 Hottest Sharp Women of 2011"

3. "Envigshed Magazine - Elisabetta Fantone stars in the up-coming indie film 'My Name is Sandy"

4. "The Canadian actress and painter enjoys chardonnay and would share a bottle with Marilyn Monroe"

5. "ArtnHustle - Elisabetta Fantone: A Double Threat"

6. "Global Runway - Q&A with actress/painter/model Elisabetta Fantone"

7. "Rencontre avec Elisabetta Fantone by Nathalie Slight

8. "Kurbatoff Gallery, Vancouver, Artist"

9. "Thompson Landry Gallery, Toronto, Artist"

10. "Sharp Magazine: Elisabetta Fantone The Canadian stunner has proven to be a Jill of all trades, and we love her in all of them."

11. "Elisabetta's fine art talent spans across several artistic endeavours"

12. "SNAP Downtown Toronto: Now and Then by Elisabetta Fantone

13. "Elisabetta Fantone: Five (non-TIFF) things to do this week: Sept.10-16"

14. "Pop Up Pop Art Party" Elisabetta Fantone - Now and Then, Toronto

15. "Actress, Artist, Author: Elisabetta Fantone - She's worked with the Kardashians and she's also appearing on the big screen

16. "CityTV, Bake Sale with Elisabetta Fantone on What's Cooking"

17. "Atlantic Ave. Magazine - Cover: Elisabetta Fantone (June,2011)

18. "Nelligan vu par...Elisabetta Fantone"

19. "Autone Magazine, Germany, Elisabetta Fantone - Canadian Movie Star

20. "Cover Girl Elisabetta Fantone"

21. "Maison D'aujourd'hui: Elisabetta Fantone - 2006

22."One canvas was sold for $8,000, which was donated to the Mira Foundation"

23. "LouLou Magazine - Alex Perron et Elisabetta Fantone"

24. "La Métropole - Elisabetta fait un Clin D'Oeil au Blondes. (November 3rd,2009)"

25. "Elisabetta: La Revanche d'une blonde. (November 2nd, 2009)

External links
 
 
Art and Film Trailer Videos

1982 births
21st-century Canadian actresses
21st-century Canadian painters
Actresses from Montreal
Artists from Montreal
Canadian pop singers
Canadian television actresses
Living people
Singers from Montreal
21st-century Canadian women singers